John Davison Bennett (June 21, 1911 – February 1, 2005) was an American lawyer and politician from New York.

Life
He was born on June 21, 1911, in Rockville Centre, Nassau County, New York, the son of Earl Job Bennett (1878–1965) and Edna (Davison) Bennett (1880–1960). He attended South Side High School in Rockville Centre, and graduated from Cornell Law School in 1935. He married Mildred Schwindt, and they had two children.

Bennett was a member of the New York State Assembly (Nassau Co., 1st D.) from 1938 to 1944, sitting in the 161st, 162nd, 163rd and 164th New York State Legislatures.

He was a member of the New York State Senate (2nd D.) from 1945 to 1953, sitting in the 165th, 166th, 167th and 168th and 169th New York State Legislatures. He resigned his seat in 1953, and on November 3, 1953, was elected as Surrogate of Nassau County.

He was Surrogate of Nassau County from 1954 to 1980; and a delegate to the New York State Constitutional Convention of 1967.

He died on February 1, 2005, at The Shores at Peconic Landing assisted living facility in Greenport, Suffolk County, New York; and was buried at the Greenfield Cemetery in Uniondale.

Sources

External links
 

1911 births
2005 deaths
People from Rockville Centre, New York
Republican Party New York (state) state senators
Republican Party members of the New York State Assembly
New York (state) state court judges
People from Greenport, Suffolk County, New York
Cornell Law School alumni
20th-century American judges
South Side High School (Rockville Centre) alumni
20th-century American politicians